The men's team pursuit race of the 2015–16 ISU Speed Skating World Cup 3, arranged in Eisstadion Inzell, in Inzell, Germany, was held on 4 December 2015.

The Dutch team won the race, with the Norwegian team in second place, and the Polish team in third.

Results
The race took place on Friday, 4 December, in the afternoon session, scheduled at 18:19.

References

Men team pursuit
3